The Water Resources Research Act of 1964 (WRRA) undertook "... a coordinated scientific research program in water...", which constitutes "... the greatest resource problem facing the West and the Nation ..." The WRRA's principal result was establishment of the National Institutes for Water Resources.

Distinctions
One of the earliest research grants of the WRRA went to eventual Nobel Memorial Prize-laureate Elinor Ostrom at the beginning of her career.

References

External links
Water Resources Research Act, as amended in 2006
Statement of President Lyndon B. Johnston on the occasion of the approval of the Water Resources Research Act of 1964, July 17, 1964

1964 in law
88th United States Congress
Water law in the United States
Water resource management in the United States